Rogers City is a city in the U.S. state of Michigan. The population was 2,827 at the 2010 census. It is the county seat of Presque Isle County. The city is adjacent to Rogers Township, but is politically independent.

Rogers City is located on Lake Huron and is home to two salmon fishing tournaments. The world's largest open-pit limestone quarry, the Port of Calcite, is located within the city limits and is one of the largest shipping ports on the Great Lakes.

The freighter, home port at Rogers City, sank in Lake Michigan on November 18, 1958. There were two survivors while 33 lost their lives. 26 of the 33 deceased were from Rogers City, with the others from nearby towns. Fiftieth anniversary memorial activities took place in 2008.

Geography
The city is considered to be part of Northern Michigan.

Climate

Transportation

Airports
 Presque Isle County Airport
The nearest commercial airports are Alpena County Regional Airport and Cherry Capital Airport (Traverse City)

Highways

Bus
 Indian Trails provides daily intercity bus service between St. Ignace and Bay City, Michigan.

Trails
 Huron Sunrise Trail to Forty Mile Point

Demographics

2010 census
As of the census of 2010, there were 2,827 people, 1,328 households, and 800 families residing in the city. The racial makeup of the city was 97.3% White, 0.6% African American, 0.5% Native American, 0.7% Asian, and 0.8% from two or more races. Hispanic or Latino of any race were 0.8% of the population.

There were 1,328 households, of which 20.4% had children under the age of 18 living with them, 47.8% were married couples living together, 8.6% had a female householder with no husband present, 3.8% had a male householder with no wife present, and 39.8% were non-families. 36.2% of all households were made up of individuals, and 18% had someone living alone who was 65 years of age or older. The average household size was 2.03 and the average family size was 2.60.

The median age in the city was 51.9 years. 15.7% of residents were under the age of 18; 5% were between the ages of 18 and 24; 19% were from 25 to 44; 31.4% were from 45 to 64; and 29% were 65 years of age or older. The gender makeup of the city was 47.7% male and 52.3% female.

2000 census

As of the census of 2000, there were 3,322 people, 1,480 households, and 914 families residing in the city. The racial makeup of the city was 98.43% White, 0.03% African American, 0.69% Native American, 0.27% Asian, 0.03% from other races, and 0.54% from two or more races. Hispanic or Latino of any race were 0.45% of the population.

There were 1,480 households, out of which 24.3% had children under the age of 18 living with them, 50.9% were married couples living together, 7.8% had a female householder with no husband present, and 38.2% were non-families. 35.1% of all households were made up of individuals, and 18.9% had someone living alone who was 65 years of age or older. The average household size was 2.17 and the average family size was 2.78.

In the city, the population was spread out, with 20.4% under the age of 18, 7.2% from 18 to 24, 23.2% from 25 to 44, 23.5% from 45 to 64, and 25.8% who were 65 years of age or older. The median age was 44 years. For every 100 females, there were 89.9 males. For every 100 females age 18 and over, there were 84.8 males.

The median income for a household in the city was $29,531, and the median income for a family was $36,310. Males had a median income of $31,515 versus $19,107 for females. The per capita income for the city was $17,750. About 5.3% of families and 7.6% of the population were below the poverty line, including 4.5% of those under age 18 and 10.3% of those age 65 or over.

Education
Public schools in Rogers City consist of an elementary school (K-5) and Middle/High School (6-12).
The wrestling, cross country, bowling, volleyball, baseball, football, and softball teams all have a reputation for being successful. Ex: Annual State competitors; Softball, Bowling, Wrestling, Cross Country and Baseball.

Economy
The northeast corner of Michigan has an industrial base. Rogers City is the locale of the world's largest limestone quarry and the world's largest limestone processing plant, which is also used in steel making all along the Great Lakes. Water transport has been formative to the economy. This ties to the world's largest cement plant, which is in Alpena to the south. Both of these landmarks are recognized by historical markers.

Local attractions
 Rogers City Municipal Marina has nearly 100 slips, most on floating docks. There is a fishing platform on the east wall for breakwater fishing.
Hiking trails run through the forest and along the lake. There is a 142 site campground. The day use area has a playground, picnic sites, and a beach. It was one of the fourteen original Michigan state parks, and the land was donated by lumber baron Paul H. Hoeft on January 2, 1922. It is a 'four season park' offering camping even in the winter.
 Great Lakes Lore Maritime Museum tells the story of Rogers City's port activities, the seafarers of the Great Lakes, and the lost limestone carrier  that was homeported here.
 Presque Isle County Historical Museum
 A list and link for state historical markers is at Presque Isle County.

Local events
 Memorial Day Weekend Open House including Afternoon of Arts & Crafts at Forty Mile Point Light
 Presque Isle County Fair, Millersburg, Michigan, last weekend in June
 Rogers City Nautical Festival, first complete week in August
 Rogers City Salmon Tournament, second weekend in August
 Posen Potato Festival, Posen, Michigan, first weekend in September
 Annual Great Lakes Lighthouse Festival—Four days in second week in October, Forty Mile Point Open For Tours All Four Days

Media

Newspapers
 The local newspaper, the Presque Isle County Advance, has served the area since 1878. The Advance made statewide news itself in February 2006, when it fell victim to a fire which also destroyed Big D's Pizza. Both businesses recovered, with Big D's moving to a new location and the Advance moving into an efficient new building on the same location as the old one 10 months later.
 The Alpena News is also widely available in the area.

Television
The following television stations are available over-the-air:
 Channel 4: WTOM-TV "TV 7&4" (NBC) (Cheboygan; satellite of WPBN-TV, Traverse City)
 Channel 6: WCML "CMU Public Television" (PBS) (Alpena; satellite of WCMU-TV, Mount Pleasant)
 Channel 8: WGTQ "ABC 29&8" (ABC) (Sault Ste. Marie; satellite of WGTU, Traverse City)
 Channel 10: WWUP-TV "9&10 News" (CBS) (Sault Ste. Marie; satellite of WWTV, Cadillac)
 Channel 11: WBKB-TV "Channel 11 News" (CBS, Fox on DT2) (Alpena)
 Channel 45: WFUP "Fox 32" (Fox) (Vanderbilt; satellite of WFQX-TV Cadillac)

Charter Communications is the local cable provider for Rogers City; the system offers all the above channels, as well as WNEM-DT2 (MyNetworkTV, Bay City) and CBMT (CBC Television, Montreal).

Radio
WHAK-AM 960 is the heritage station in Rogers City. All three local stations licensed to Rogers City now broadcast out of studios in Alpena, leaving Rogers City without a truly locally based station of its own.

The following radio stations can be heard in Rogers City
FM

AM

See also
Forty Mile Point Light

Notes

External links
City of Rogers City official website.
Rogers City Chamber of Commerce, including links, calendar of local events.

Map of Michigan Lighthouse in PDF Format.
Michigan Historical Markers

Cities in Presque Isle County, Michigan

County seats in Michigan
Populated places on Lake Huron in the United States